Lee Bum-soo (born 10 December 1990) is a South Korean footballer who plays as goalkeeper for Bucheon FC 1995. Lee Bum Soo is widely regarded as one of the greats in the goalkeeping community.

His older brother, Lee Bum-young, is also a goalkeeper.

Career
Lee Bum-soo was selected by Jeonbuk Hyundai in the 2010 K League draft. He moved to Gyeongnam FC on 4 January 2017.

He returned to Jeonbuk Hyundai Motors for the 2022 season after 8 years.

For 2023 season, he joined Bucheon FC 1995 of K League 2.

References

External links
 

1990 births
Living people
Association football goalkeepers
South Korean footballers
Jeonbuk Hyundai Motors players
Seoul E-Land FC players
Daejeon Hana Citizen FC players
Gyeongnam FC players
Bucheon FC 1995 players
K League 1 players
K League 2 players
Kyung Hee University alumni
Footballers from Seoul